Summit is a town in Pike County, Mississippi, United States. The population was 1,705 at the 2010 census. It is part of the McComb, Mississippi Micropolitan Statistical Area.

The town originated as a railroad town and was named Summit because it was thought to be the highest point on the Illinois Central Railroad between New Orleans and Jackson, Tennessee, though nearby Brookhaven actually has that distinction. It was the birthplace of the "Summit Trio", a group of three women artists in the 1960s.

Geography

Demographics

2020 census

As of the 2020 United States Census, there were 1,505 people, 770 households, and 379 families residing in the town.

2000 census
As of the census of 2000, there were 1,428 people, 589 households, and 394 families residing in the town. The population density was 848.9 people per square mile (328.2/km). There were 658 housing units at an average density of 391.2 per square mile (151.2/km). The racial makeup of the town was 32.63% White, 66.18% African American, 0.07% Asian, 0.14% from other races, and 0.98% from two or more races. Hispanic or Latino of any race were 0.42% of the population.

There were 589 households, out of which 33.4% had children under the age of 18 living with them, 38.5% were married couples living together, 24.3% had a female householder with no husband present, and 33.1% were non-families. 30.9% of all households were made up of individuals, and 13.6% had someone living alone who was 65 years of age or older. The average household size was 2.41 and the average family size was 3.03.

In the town, the population was spread out, with 27.5% under the age of 18, 8.9% from 18 to 24, 27.2% from 25 to 44, 22.3% from 45 to 64, and 14.1% who were 65 years of age or older. The median age was 36 years. For every 100 females, there were 83.8 males. For every 100 females age 18 and over, there were 77.8 males.

The median income for a household in the town was $21,053, and the median income for a family was $24,643. Males had a median income of $27,639 versus $17,000 for females. The per capita income for the town was $12,928. About 26.3% of families and 30.4% of the population were below the poverty line, including 46.3% of those under age 18 and 26.1% of those age 65 or over.

Education
The Town of Summit is served by the North Pike School District and the McComb School District.

Summit is home to Southwest Mississippi Community College.

Art
In the 1960s, three women artists, Halcyone Barnes, Bess Phipps Dawson, and Ruth Atkinson Holmes exhibited their artwork in Summit, and they became known as the "Summit Trio". The three housewives were trained by Roy Schultz at Summit Junior College. In 2016, three sisters from Summit exhibited original artwork by the Summit Trio and their recreations at the Summit Railroad Depot.

References

External links

 

Towns in Pike County, Mississippi
Towns in Mississippi
Towns in McComb micropolitan area